Black Knight 2000 is a 1989 pinball game designed by Steve Ritchie (who also provides the Knight's voice) and released by Williams Electronics. The game is the sequel to the 1980 pinball machine Black Knight. It was advertised with the slogan "He rides again." and features a black knight theme. 30 years later, Ritchie would design a third game in the series for Stern Pinball, titled Black Knight: Sword of Rage.

Legacy
Black Knight 2000 appears in episode 7 of season 1 of The X-Files as well as the pinball machine Totem.

Black Knight 2000 was formerly available as a licensed table in The Pinball Arcade for any platform until June 30, 2018. It was also included in the arcade game UltraPin.

References

External links
IPDB listing for Black Knight 2000

Williams pinball machines
1989 pinball machines